Qaed Taher (also Romanized as Qā’ed Ţāher and Qā’īd Ţāher) is a village in Gudarzi Rural District, Oshtorinan District, Borujerd County, Lorestan Province, Iran. At the 2006 census, its population was 1,945, in 533 families.

References 

Towns and villages in Borujerd County